Chengdu-Chongqing dialect or Cheng–Yu (Sichuanese Pinyin: Cen2yu2) is the most widely used branch of Southwestern Mandarin, with about 90 million speakers. It is named after Chengdu, the capital city of Sichuan, and Chongqing, which was split from Sichuan in 1997. It is spoken mainly in northern and eastern Sichuan, the northeastern part of the Chengdu Plain, several cities or counties in southwestern Sichuan (Panzhihua, Dechang, Yanyuan, Huili and Ningnan), southern Shaanxi and western Hubei.

This uniform dialect is formed after the great migration movement in Ming and Qing dynasty, and is greatly influenced by the Chinese varieties of Mandarin the immigrants spoke  from Hubei, Xiang and Gan. So it keeps fewer characteristics of Sichuan's original Ba-Shu Chinese than other Sichuanese dialects, such as Minjiang dialect.

Distributions 
Chengdu-Chongqing Dialect is spoken within central Chongqing, Chengdu and surrounding provinces. Chengdu-Chongqing dialect is a branch of Sichuan dialect.

Academically, Chongqing dialects are spoken in main urban area of Chongqing, with one-fifth population of the Chongqing city.

In a broad sense, Chongqing dialect is spoken with all districts of Chongqing City. Eg: Tongliang District, Hechuan District, Fuling District, Zhanjiang District, etc. Chongqing dialect its considered as a branch of Southwestern Mandarin.

The Chengdu-Chongqing dialect is mutually intelligible with dialects spoken in its satellite districts such Sichuan. But, as all public schools and most broadcast communication in urban Chongqing use Mandarin exclusively, nearly all speakers of the dialect are good at Chongqing dialect and Mandarin. Owing to migration within China, traditional Chongqing dialect is getting similar to Mandarin, many residents of the city cannot speak the local dialect but can usually understand it, and get fluent to it after a few months or years in the area.

History 
With Chinese government declared movement to Chongqing during the World War II, Chongqing became the Provisional capital of the republic of China, when migration boost the population of the city. Chongqing dialect mixes the merits of various local dialects, with wits and humor, gains popularity with its users.

Phonology

Tone 
Chengdu-Chongqing dialect has four phonemic tones: dark level tone, light level tone, rising tone and departing tone. These tones are of same pitch as Sichuan dialects (Minjiang, Renfu, Yajin).

Initial 
The Chengdu-Chongqing dialect in most regions doesn't have tongue retroflex (tʂ group initials), except for Bazhong district and Panxi area (except for Panzhihua), where the consonants of the tongue curling are similar but not the same as Mandarin.

The following is the initial consonant inventory of Chengdu-Chongqing dialect:

In particular, the consonants of Chengdu are comparable but not identical to those in Mandarin. See the inventories below:

Final 
A final, the remainder of syllable after the initial, consists of an optional medial glide, a vowel and an optional final consonants. Chengdu dialect with 62 districts using has 36 finals, Chongqing dialect with 37 districts using it has 37 finals.

The following is the inventory of Sichuanese finals, transcribed in the International Phonetic Alphabet:

Vowels and consonants 
Tones of Chongqing-Chengdu dialect is very similar, but not the same as that of Sichuanese. These vowels keep the throw tight, ensures the muscles of the larynx and oral cavity tense during pronounce, so that the entire syllable exhibits a rough and tight state.

The vowels in Chengdu are given below:

The following table shows the tense vowels of Chengdu-Chongqing dialect, and a comparison with other Sichuanese dialects:

Literary and colloquial readings of Chongqing-Chengdu dialect 
Affected by Mandarin for a long time, literary and colloquial readings appears in Chongqing-Chengdu dialect. Colloquial readings is usually the inherent reading style from ancient Sichuan dialect, mainly appears in high-frequency everyday communication; Literary readings are close to modern Mandarin, normally appears in written language. The literary and colloquial readings have been developing in the recent decades. However, affected by the promotion of Mandarin Chinese by the Chinese government, literary readings are becoming dominant, and some pronunciations have the tend to disappear.  Literary and colloquial readings of Chinese character in Chengdu are shown below. Note: the table is only based on 《成都语音的初步研究》in 1958, the changes of Chengdu dialect in recent years are not considered:

Vocabulary 
As a branch of Sichuanese, Chengdu-Chongqing dialect is mainly composed of three parts: ancient Ba-Shu Chinese, vocabulary brought by immigrants in Ming and Qing Dynasties, and lingua franca of ancient China.

Chengdu-Chongqing dialect is a branch of Sichuan dialect, which is very different compared with other Chinese. Yunnan dialect, which is considered very similar to Sichuan dialect, only shares 58.3% identical words. Sichuan dialect is also influenced by Xiang Chinese and Gan Chinese, the vocabulary of Sichuan dialect is very different from northern Mandarin, with only 47.8% similar vocabulary.

Recently, many loanwords have been introduced to Chengdu and Chongqing from standard Mandarin and English. Meanwhile, new words are developing Chengdu and Chongqing, which then spread at a dramatic speed through China. For example, “雄起”(xióng qǐ) (meaning to "cheer up"), is a typical Chengdu-Chongqing word that gets popular in China, equivalent to "加油" (jiāyóu) in standard Mandarin.

References